Imaad Wasif is an Indian singer, guitarist and songwriter whose music combines elements of psychedelic folk and rock.  Wasif’s music has been described as "unbelievably intense with sparkling, raga-influenced guitar and a mystic bent."

In 2006, he started releasing solo albums. Also during 2006–2008, Wasif played with Yeah Yeah Yeahs for the Show Your Bones world tour playing acoustic guitar, bass and synths. He performed as the supporting act for most shows. He stopped touring with YYY's in 2008 to focus on his own music. Wasif assumed more of a collaborative role, writing songs with Karen O for the soundtrack to Where the Wild Things Are (2009), most notably the song, "Hideaway."

His first self-titled solo album was released in 2006 on Kill Rock Stars.  The record featured minimal, acoustic songs with psychedelic influences, reminiscent of Skip Spence’s Oar and Syd Barrett’s Opel, and was recorded by Mark Nevers in Nashville, TN.  This record introduced Wasif’s primary lyrical themes; love, madness, transformation, isolation, and spiritual influences, which continue through his subsequent albums.

Wasif’s second album, Strange Hexes, was recorded in Los Angeles and self-released in 2008.  The album is a "tense, trippy collection of songs that become fiercely emotional explorations."  The songs incorporate Eastern modal tunings and drones.

Wasif’s third album, The Voidist, was released in 2010 on Tee Pee Records.  Recorded in Los Angeles, The Voidist is at once "regal and exuberant.  Its unique sonic tapestry is sprinkled with ragas, blues rock, and something totally new that exists at the apex of these varied influences."  Influences that Wasif has cited include Paul Bowles, Gérard de Nerval, Neil Young, CAN, John Fahey, Captain Beefheart, Jimmy Page, and Vilayat Khan.

In 2017, Wasif released "Dzi,". The album was recorded on a Tascam Cassette 8-Track Machine, capturing a raw, live feel.

Wasif's album Great Eastern Sun was released on December 1, 2018, on Nomad Eel Records. His sixth album, So Long Mr. Fear, was released on Aug 9, 2022. Co-produced with Bobb Bruno and mixed by Lewis Pesacov, the album was recorded remotely during the pandemic year 2021. The album features a vocal appearance by Karen O on the song "Poet Of The Damned".

Film 

Wasif played the role of a British musician named Dean in the 2002 film Laurel Canyon, directed by Lisa Cholodenko. The film starred Frances McDormand & Christian Bale.

Discography 

Solo albums

 So Long Mr. Fear (Sonic Ritual, 2022)
 Great Eastern Sun (Nomad Eel Records, 2018)
 Dzi (Grey Market, 2017)
 The Voidist (Tee Pee Records, 2009)
 Strange Hexes (World In Sound, 2008)
 Imaad Wasif (Kill Rock Stars, 2006)

Solo contributions on compilations

 "We Give Our Lives" on "Ye Are Gods" by Sabbath Assembly (Svart Records, 2012)
 "Go Insane" (Doors Cover) on Beat LA Compilation (Narnack Records. 2011)
 "The Fire" (ft. Lykke Li) on L'Aventure (remake of the 2nd Television album) (Aquarium Drunkard, 2010)
 "Not Immune" on RAISE Hope For Congo Compilation (Mercer Street Records, 2010)
 "Ecstasy" on LA Collection 7" (IAMSOUND, 2010)
 "The New Year" on Kill Rock Stars Winter Holiday Album (Kill Rock Stars, 2006)
 "Other Voices" on The Sound the Hare Heard (Kill Rock Stars, 2006)

Bands, collaborations, and guest appearances
 ACID - "Romance" (Narnack Records, 2021)
 ACID - "Science Fiction with Acid" (Narnack Records, 2021)
 ACID - "Persona" (Narnack Records, 2021)
 Willie Nelson & Karen O - Under Pressure, (BMG, 2020)
Karen O - Crush Songs, (Cult Records, 2014)
 Sabbath Assembly – Eno Ot Derotser (Svart Records, 2014)
 Grim Tower - Anarchic Breezes, (Outer Battery Records, 2013)
 Electric Flower –  EP lI (Narnack Records, 2012)
 Electric Flower –  EP l (Narnack Records, 2011)
 Where the Wild Things Are: Motion Picture Soundtrack (Interscope, 2009)
 Lou Barlow – Goodnight Unknown (Merge, 2009)
 Yeah Yeah Yeahs – Its Blitz! (Interscope, 2009)
 Yeah Yeah Yeahs – "The Love I’m Searching For" (AOL Exclusive, 2007)
 Yeah Yeah Yeahs – Mississippi Studios: Live, Vol. 3 (2007)
 Yeah Yeah Yeahs – Live Session EP (iTunes Exclusive, 2007)
 Lou Barlow – Emoh (Merge, 2005)
 Alaska! – Kiss You/Pink Frost, CD Single (Altitude Records, 2005)
 Alaska! – Rescue Through Tomahawk (Altitude Records, 2005)
 Alaska! – Five Songs (self-released, 2004)
 Alaska! –  "r u listenin" on Tracks & Fields (compilation)  (Kill Rock Stars, 2004)
 The Folk Implosion – The New Folk Implosion (iMusic, 2003)
 The Folk Implosion – Pearl, 7" (Domino, 2003)
 The Folk Implosion – Brand of Skin, 7" (Domino, 2003)
 Alaska! – "In My Time" on The Fold Comp (compilation) (Credit Records, 2003)
 Alaska! – "Lost the Gold" on Speed of Sound (compilation)  (Flying Nun Records, 2003)
 Alaska! – Emotions (Flying Nun Records, 2003)
 Alaska! – Four Songs (self-released, 2001)
 Lowercase – The Going Away Present (Punk in My Vitamins, 1999)
 Lowercase – "Surefire Solvent" on Multi-Vitamin Compilation (Punk In My Vitamins, 1998)
 Lowercase – The Open Sea / Don’t Cry No Tears, Mail Order Freak Singles Club #1–4, 7" (Kill Rock Stars, 1998)
 Lowercase – Imbedded In Ice, 7″ (Punk in My Vitamins, 1998)
 Lowercase – "Ringbleeder" on AmRep Equipped (compilation) (Amphetamine Reptile, 1997)
 Lowercase – Kill The Lights (Amphetamine Reptile, 1997)
 Lowercase – All Destructive Urges…Seem So Perfect (Amphetamine Reptile, 1996)
 Lowercase – "My Shame Your Shame" (compilation) (WIN Records, 1995)
 Lowercase – Cadence, 7″ (Amphetamine Reptile, 1995)
 Lowercase – Brass Tacks, 7″ (Xmas Records, 1995)
 Lowercase – Two Songs, 7″ (Punk in My Vitamins, 1995)

References

External links 
 Official Site
 2006 article in No Depression
 2008 article in LA Weekly
 2008 interview in L.A. Record
 2009 interview
 2010 Circa Poetry Journal

Living people
Canadian folk musicians
Canadian people of Indian descent
Canadian rock guitarists
Canadian male guitarists
The Folk Implosion members
1977 births